King Salman International Airport is a proposed airport project in Riyadh, Saudi Arabia. The airport will span 57 square kilometers and have no fewer than six parallel runways. The airport aims to have capacity for 120 million annual passengers by 2030, and 185 million annual passengers by 2050. It is expected to be one of the world's largest airports according to the Saudi Press Agency. It will be built over the current King Khalid International Airport. The airport will be designed by Foster + Partners.

References

Proposed airports in Saudi Arabia
Public Investment Fund